The General Secretariat of Ukraine was the autonomous Ukrainian executive government of the Russian Republic from June 28, 1917 to January 22, 1918. For most of its existence it was headed by Volodymyr Vynnychenko.

The secretariat was created after the Central Council of Ukraine accepted a proposal of the Ukrainian Party of Socialist Revolutionaries. According to the Encyclopedia of Ukraine, this event took place five days after the proclamation of the 1st Universal of the Central Council of Ukraine, however many contemporary historians have other opinions in that regard. The initial composition of the secretariat included eight General Secretaries (ministers) and one General Scribe (secretary).

Background
The first document of the government that identified its program was the Declaration of the General Secretariat. It was publicly announced at the plenum meeting of the Central Council of Ukraine on June 26 by the head of the Secretariat, Volodymyr Vynnychenko. The document together with the First Universal caused a lot of worrying in Petrograd as precedent to possible separation. It only took several days when the official delegation led by Aleksandr Kerensky together with the Minister of Foreign Affairs Tereschenko and Minister of Post and Telegraph Tsereteli arrived to Kiev. The Russian delegation and the members of the General Secretariat along with Mykhailo Hrushevsky after some discussion worked out the new Universal of the UPR and the Declaration of the Russian Provisional Government that were announced on July 3.

On July 13, 1917 the Russian Provisional Government recognized the Secretariat as the highest executive power in Ukraine and requested from the Tsentralna Rada that the members of the secretariat ought to be confirmed by the Russian Government. The Secretariat would be expanded to include members of minorities and would be responsible to the Rada. By the end of July 1917 five more secretariats were added due to the Provisional Government request.

In course of the next round of negotiations now in Petrograd the Ukrainian delegation was requesting the acceptance of the General Secretariat Statute by the Russian Provisional Government, which was approved by the Central Rada and proclaimed as the first Constitution. Those Negotiations ended with that the Prime Minister of Russia, Aleksandr Kerensky, signed the Instruction for the General Secretariat of the Provisional Government in Ukraine, a legal normative act, that was binding the local government of Ukraine for its execution. According to the Instruction, the General Secretariat had limited powers, but was acknowledged as the highest institution of the Provisional Government in Ukraine and authority of which stretched upon five gubernias Volyn, Podillia, Poltava, Kiev, and partially Chernihiv. The Russian Provisional Government requested the Secretariat to be reduced to nine members and that all of the members will be appointed by the Russian Government by the recommendations of the Tsentralna Rada. The secretariats of the military affairs, food and legal affairs, and postmaster-telegraph were to be canceled.

After some negotiations the Tsentralna Rada yielded to the request on August 7, followed by the resignation of Volodymyr Vynnychenko as a sign of protest and pressure from the Ukrainian Socialist Revolutionary Party. Mala Rada has accepted his resignation on August 13. Dmytro Doroshenko (UPSF), a former head commissioner of the Provisional Government of Galicia and Bucovina, was offered to create a new Secretariat. The Mala Rada has confirmed his selections already on August 14, but soon Doroshenko resigned on August 18. Finally Vynnychenko came back to accomplish the task and on September 1 the Provisional Government confirmed the new administration. Until January 1918 the Secretariat conducted 63 meetings where were reviewed 430 various issues of political, economical, military, and diplomatic character.

In October 1917, the Russian Provisional Government stopped the transfer of funds to the General Secretariat and expressed its intentions to file a claim against its members for separatism and the participation in the All-Ukrainian Constituent Assembly. The Russian government requested an appearance of Volodymyr Vynnychenko personally for the full explanation in that regard. On October 21 at the meeting of the Secretariat was reviewed the issue of sending delegation to Petrograd headed by Vynnychenko together with Steshenko and Zarubin for the negotiations with the Provisional Government in reference to the political situation in Ukraine. That intention was ceased due to the change of power in the country with the utilization of the military force. After the October Revolution of 1917 the Secretariat was forced to expanded once again to supplement the ministries of the collapsed Provisional Government.

After the proclamation of the Third Universal on November 20, 1917 number of secretaries have resigned. Later on January 6, 1918 Symon Petliura was commissioned to take the charge of the Haydamaka Kish. By start of 1918 the Secretariat has changed dramatically. On January 25 (dated January 22), 1918 the General Secretariat was transformed into the Council of People's Ministers after the declaration of the IV Universal and independence of the Ukrainian People's Republic.

Location 
Initially the government was located at the same location as the Central Rada at 54 vulytsia Volodymyrska (Volodymyr Street), however Volodymyr Vynnychenko knew that it could not last for long as it only had two rooms assigned in the mediocre building. The government soon moved to 38 Khreshchatyk Street in the building of former hotel "Savvoi" which has not preserved after World War II. Currently at that location exists the building of the Kyiv City Council (36 Khreshchatyk Street). The first government budget was adopted on August 30, 1917. The proposition to move to the building of "Savvoi" hotel came up on the session of the Central Rada on September 13, 1917 with intentions to lease the place from the city government, under jurisdiction of which the hotel was.

The General Secretariat was allowed to move to "Savvoi" sometime in late September 1917, however that place was decided to be a temporary due to the physical conditions of the building. Vynnychenko tried to acquire the Mariinskyi Palace from the "Worker's and Soldier's Deputies", but unsuccessfully. Other interests were posed by the hotel "Frantsiya" (corner of Khreshchatyk and Prorizna vulytsia) and the Popov building (22 vulytsia Hrushevskoho). Today in place of the former hotel is located the building of Ministry of Energy and Fuel.

The General Secretariat was finally able to move to the former Palace of Governor-General in Kiev at 40 vulytsia Instytutska (Institute Street) in January 1918, while the hotel "Savvoi" after being restored was also secured after the Ukrainian government. Later the Palace has suffered greatly during the military actions in 1920 and was replaced by other building changing the address to 20/8 Institute Street.

List of governments
 First Vynnychenko Government (July 13 – August 13)
 Doroshenko Government
 Second Vynnychenko Government (September 1, 1917 – January 1918)

See also
 People's Secretariat, a Bolshevik's oppositional government
 Regional Committee in Protection of Revolution in Ukraine

References

Bibliography
Khrystiuk, P. Zamitky i materiially do istoriï ukraïns’koï revoliutsiï 1917–1920 rr., vol 2 (Notes and materials to the history of the Ukrainian Revolution 1917-1920, vol.2)(Vienna 1921, New York 1969)
Zolotarev, A. Iz istoriï Tsentral’noï Ukraïns’koï Rady—1917 (Out of the history of the Central Ukrainian Council) (Kharkiv 1922)
Doroshenko, D. Istoriia Ukraïny 1917–1923 rr., vol 1: Doba Tsentral’noï Rady (History of Ukraine 1917-1923, vol.1: Times of the Central Council) (Uzhhorod 1932, New York 1954)
Pidhainy, O. The Formation of the Ukrainian Republic (Toronto–New York 1966)
Zozulia, Ia. (ed). Velyka Ukraïns’ka revoliutsiia: Kalendar istorychnykh podii za liutyi 1917 roku–berezen’ 1918 roku (The Great Ukrainian Revolution: Calendar of historic activities from February 1917 to March 1918) (New York 1967)
Reshetar Jr, J. The Ukrainian Revolution, 1917–1920: A Study in Nationalism (Princeton 1952, New York 1972)
Hunczak, T. (ed). The Ukraine, 1917–1921: A Study in Revolution (Cambridge, Mass 1977)
Verstiuk, V. (ed.) Ukraïns’ka Tsentral’na Rada: dokumenty i materiially v dvokh tomakh (The Ukrainian Central Council: documents and materials in two volumes) (Kyiv 1996–7)

External links
 Encyclopedia of Ukraine 
 Addresses of the first government 
 Sources to studying of the process of formation of the executive power of Ukraine in time of the Ukrainian People's Republic
 General Secretariat of Ukraine. Minor Dictionary on the History of Ukraine

Ukrainian People's Republic
General Secretariat of Ukraine
History of Kyiv
Government of Ukraine
Ukraine
Political history of Ukraine
1917 in Ukraine
1918 in Ukraine